Danielle Suzanne Lappage (born 24 September 1990) is a wrestler competing for Canada. She won a gold medal in the 63 kg freestyle at the 2014 Commonwealth Games in Glasgow. She finished in 5th place at the 2014 World Wrestling Championships.

Sports career
In 2010 Lappage was crowned world junior champion at 63 kg.

In July 2016, she was officially named to Canada's 2016 Olympic team. At the 2016 Summer Olympics, she finished in 16th place after losing to Yuliya Tkach in the qualification round.

She represented Canada at the 2020 Summer Olympics in Tokyo, Japan. She competed in the women's freestyle 68 kg event.

Personal life
Lappage is a graduate of the University of Calgary Faculty of Law.

References

External links
 

1990 births
Living people
Canadian female sport wrestlers
Commonwealth Games gold medallists for Canada
Commonwealth Games medallists in wrestling
Olympic wrestlers of Canada
People from Olds, Alberta
Sportspeople from Alberta
World Wrestling Championships medalists
Wrestlers at the 2014 Commonwealth Games
Wrestlers at the 2016 Summer Olympics
Wrestlers at the 2018 Commonwealth Games
Wrestlers at the 2020 Summer Olympics
Medallists at the 2014 Commonwealth Games
Medallists at the 2018 Commonwealth Games